Lipsky or Lipski is a surname, and may refer to:

 Ariane Lipski, Brazilian mixed martial artist
 David Lipsky, American author
 David Lipsky (born 1988), American golfer
 Donald Lipski, American sculptor
 Eleazar Lipsky, American lawyer, novelist, playwright, president of the Jewish Telegraphic Agency
 Elizabeth Lipski, American author, professor, and clinical nutritionist
 Israel Lipski, convicted murderer in Victorian London
 Jan Lipski, bishop of Chełmno
 Jan Józef Lipski, Polish politician and literary critic
 John Lipsky, American Director of the IMF (May 15, 2011), previously vice-chairman of JPMorgan
 John Lipski, American football player
 John M. Lipski, American linguist
 Josef Lipski, Polish diplomat
 Mark Lipsky, American producer
 Michael Lipsky, professor
 Oldřich Lipský, Czech filmmaker
 Pat Lipsky, American painter
 Patryk Lipski, Polish footballer
 Sam Lipski, Australian journalist
 Seth Lipsky, American founder and editor of the New York Sun
 Scott Lipsky (born 1981), American tennis player
 Vladimir Lipsky, Ukrainian botanist

Fictional
 Doctor Drakken (Drew Theodore P. Lipsky)
 Motor Ed (Eddy Lipsky)

See also
Lipnitsky
Lipsko County (powiat lipski), an administrative division in eastern Poland
House of Lipski

Surnames
Polish-language surnames
Polish toponymic surnames
Jewish surnames